Pristen is a rural locality (a selo) in Valuysky District, Belgorod Oblast, Russia. The population was 74 as of 2010. There are 5 streets.

Geography 
Pristen is located 12 km southwest of Valuyki (the district's administrative centre) by road. Kurgashki is the nearest rural locality.

References 

Rural localities in Valuysky District